Methylmalonic aciduria and homocystinuria type C protein (MMACHC) is a protein that in humans is encoded by the MMACHC gene.

Function 

The C-terminal region of the product of the MMACHC gene is similar to TonB, a bacterial protein involved in energy transduction for cobalamin uptake. The MMACHC gene product catalyzes the decyanation of cyanocobalamin as well as the dealkylation
of alkylcobalamins including methylcobalamin and adenosylcobalamin. This function has also been attributed to cobalamin reductases. The MMACHC gene product and cobalamin reductases enable the interconversion of cyano- and alkylcobalamins.

Clinical significance 

Mutations are associated with methylmalonic acidemia.

References

Further reading

External links
  GeneReviews/NCBI/NIH/UW entry on Disorders of Intracellular Cobalamin Metabolism